Ancient X-Files is a series on the National Geographic Channel. Each episode contains one or two mysterious stories of the ancient past. As the show unfolds, it attempts to scientifically investigate legends and myths.

The series premiered on 11 June 2015 in Australia on History Channel.

Episodes
The episodes are sometimes aired in different order.

Season 1

Season 2

See also
Ancient Secrets

References

External links
 Ancient X-Files at imdb.com

National Geographic (American TV channel)
2010 American television series debuts
2010s American documentary television series
Paranormal television